Arka Gdynia  is a Polish professional women's basketball club. It was founded in 1946 in the city of Gdańsk as Spójnia Gdańsk. In 1992 the club moved from Gdańsk to Gdynia and changed the name to Bałtyk Gdynia. Then it changed its name several times. From 2001 till 2010 the name of the club was Lotos Gdynia after its titular sponsor Grupa Lotos S.A. Since 2014 the name was Basket 90 Gdynia and from 2018 the club is called Arka Gdynia. It plays in the Energa Basket Liga Kobiet, the highest competition in Poland.

Titles
 EuroLeague Women:
 2nd place (2): 2002, 2004
 Polish Championship (13): 1996, 1998, 1999, 2000, 2001, 2002, 2003, 2004, 2005, 2009, 2010, 2020, 2021
 Polish Cup (9): 1970, 1980, 1997, 2005, 2007, 2008, 2010, 2011, 2020

Current roster

Notable former players

References

External links

Sport in Gdynia
Women's basketball teams in Poland
EuroLeague Women clubs
Basketball teams established in 1946